TyDi (born Tyson Illingworth, 31 May 1987) is an Australian songwriter, record producer and DJ specializing in electronic dance music. Originally from Queensland, TyDi was signed by Armin van Buuren's Armada label at 17 and was ranked at No. 1 of Junkee's Australian Top 50 DJs in 2008 and 2009.

In 2009, he released his first album entitled Look Closer and in 2011 his second album Shooting Stars. It reached No.1 on the Australian, Canadian, Finnish and UK iTunes Dance charts and No.4 in the USA. Between 2008 and 2012 TyDi was included in the annual DJ Mag Top 100 DJs poll, with his highest position at No. 48 in 2011. In October 2012, TyDi signed a worldwide publishing deal with Rondor/Universal Music and a record deal with Republic Records in April 2013. His third album, Hotel Rooms, was released 22 November 2013.

His fourth album, Redefined, was released on 30 September 2014 and debuted at No. 4 on the USA iTunes dance chart and No.5 on the Australian iTunes dance chart. "Redefined", the title track on TyDi's third album, became the number one dance airplay record in the USA and also reached as high as No.9 on the Billboard Dance/Mix Show Airplay Chart in April 2015. It was also named Sirius XM Electro No.1 song of 2015. His sixth album, Collide, a collaboration with Christopher Tin, was released on 9 March 2018.

Life and career

Early years
Tyson is from Mooloolaba on Queensland's Sunshine Coast. At 14, he became keen on dance music, particularly trance, and began DJing. His parents encouraged him to play an instrument, but he became interested in turntables and songwriting. He began participating in competition when he was 16. One competition misprinted his nickname "Tydi" as "tyDi," which led to the stylization of his stage name. Tydi graduated from Queensland Conservatorium of Music with a Bachelor of Music Technology.

In 2006, he entered Junkee's Australian Top 50 DJs at No. 12, and No. 4 the following year. In 2008, he reached No. 1, becoming the youngest person to top the chart.

2009–2011: Look Closer and Shooting Stars
In 2009, TyDi released his debut album Look Closer, which reached No. 2 in the Australian Dance Charts. It featured 15 predominantly trance tracks. A review from Junkee's In The Mix stated, "Look Closer is an absolute belter of a debut, and displays a musical maturity way beyond Tydi's years." Electronic music website Trance.nu wrote that Look Closer was "of world class quality the likes of some of the best trance and progressive artist albums out there." A few months later he mixed a disc for the annual Ministry of Sound Trance Nation release and continued at No. 1 for the 2009 Junkee DJ chart.

During 2009 and 2010, Tydi released singles such as "You Walk Away" (featuring Audrey Gallagher), "Good Dream", "Vanilla" (featuring Tanya Zygar), (again featuring Audrey Gallagher) and the anthem "Half Light" (featuring Tanya Zygar). In February 2010, he won "Best Break-Through DJ" at the International Dance Music Awards (IDMA), against Boys Noize, Chuckie, Joris Voorn and Super8 & Tab. On 16 April 2011, TyDi made first appearance at the annual A State of Trance (ASOT) at Sydney's Acer Arena. He also appeared during ASOT 550 in Kiev, Ukraine in 2012.

TyDi's second album, Shooting Stars, in August 2011. The album explored several genres of electronic music, unlike his trance-heavy debut album. It featured collaborations with vocalists such as Tania Zygar, Brianna Holan, Audrey Gallagher and DJ Rap. Talking Reviews said "For want of a better description, this musical journey is nothing short of astounding and breath taking". Meanwhile, Beat Magazine described the final track, "Ariana," "could be rated the best album outro of 2011." About half of the tracks have been released in extended club mixes or remixes. After the album release, TyDi continued touring, playing many shows a year in London, Macau, Sydney, and his hometown of Brisbane.

2012–2014: Hotel Rooms, label change, and Redefined 

In October 2012, TyDi released, "Glow in the Dark", a collaboration with Ultra Records artist Kerli, which played on over 10 Top 40 radio stations. The accompanying music video was premiered on VEVO.com and shown on MTV's Clubland. Later that month, tyDi signed a worldwide publishing deal with Rondor/Universal Music. He signed his first major label record deal with Republic Records in April 2013. His EP When I Go was released in January 2013 containing two trance tracks, a progressive house number and a chillout track as well as multiple remixes.

His third album, a chillout album called Hotel Rooms, was released 22 November 2013. TyDi worked with American producer and DJ BT to collaborate on two tracks on BT's ninth album A Song Across Wires: "Tonight" (with JES) and "Stem the Tides" (with Tania Zygar). In August 2014, he released "Stay" with Dia Frampton, the runner up in The Voice's debut season.

TyDi's fourth album, Redefined, was released on 30 September 2014. The project features vocals by Chris Carrabba and Jordan Witzigreuter. The album reached No. 5 on both the US and Australian iTunes dance charts on day of release. According to TyDi, Redefined represented a change in his approach to music creation, focusing more on songwriting rather than just hooks and rhythms. The album took three years to write and produce, during which time approximately 300 songs that were started were whittled down to the final 20. The album was not genre specific with house, progressive house, pop (ish), trance and chillout tracks all making the final cut. The title track, "ReDefined", reach number one on the dance airplay charts in the US in April 2015. Following the making of the music video for the song, it was revealed that Redefined was the final piece in a planned sequence. The trilogy begins with "Live This Lie" and ends with "Stay" but "Redefined" was the missing middle piece completing the story.

On 20 November 2014, TyDi announced that he had made a promise to all of his trance fans and would be producing an EP in time for Christmas with all money being donated to children in need. That EP, The Promise, was released on 14 December 2014. It features five trance tracks in his "old" style (circa 2008) and features not only solo tracks but collaborations with Audrey Gallagher, The Ready Set, Dennis Sheppard and Jennifer Rene.

2015-present: Collide 
On 18 September 2015, tyDi released his single "Tear Me Up," a pop track featuring vocalist Nash Overstreet, who is also the lead guitarist in the band Hot Chelle Rae. The track peaked at No. 49 on the Dance/Electronic Billboard chart.

On 14 July 2015, tyDi revealed that a new artist that had appeared on SoundCloud early in 2015, was in fact his alter-ego. According to the post, Wish I Was was his "darker" side. The post also suggests, Wish I Was came about because Tyson had entered an extended creative block when trying to write songs as TyDi. However, after writing about half the tracks that eventually came out on the debut Wish I Was EP, internet publications began to report on the producer, at first suggesting it might be the work of Galantis before TyDi eventually owned up to the project himself. On 6 May 2016, the first Wish I Was EP was released on iTunes featuring 15 tracks.

Collide is TyDi's sixth feature album and is a collaboration with composer Christopher Tin. Released 8 March 2018, it took 3 years to create. The album featured 12 tracks. TyDi stated in July 2018 he had been asked to work on some songs in the worldwide Disney on Ice production.

Awards
No.1 DJ - 2008 Sony InTheMix Top 50 Awards
No.1 DJ - 2009 InTheMix Top 50 Awards

In February 2010, tyDi won the "Best Breakthrough DJ" award at the International Dance Music Awards.

In 2015, tyDi was awarded the Griffith University Young Outstanding Alumnus of the Year for his contributions to the music industry.

Other ventures
In October 2015, TyDi appeared as a guest on the Herd Mentality Podcast with host Adam Reakes to discuss his personal love of science, critical thinking in the music industry, and the hidden scientific meanings embedded in his song titles. TyDi reveals himself to be a proponent of secular scientific research, and a critic of Homeopathic medicines and treatments.

Global Soundsystem Podcast
From November 2011 through to June 2016, tyDi hosted a weekly radio show/podcast of world electronic dance music called Global Soundsystem. All up there were 331 episodes. On 10 May 2012, the show was shortened from a two-hour to a one-hour format. It was syndicated to more than 30 countries weekly and is still available for download via iTunes and some episodes are also available on SoundCloud.

The 50th episode included many well-known DJs including Paul Oakenfold, Judge Jules, Sasha, Sander Van Doorn and Markus Schulz. The 100th episode was special in a different way with fans introducing all of the tracks.

Discography

Studio albums
 Look Closer (2009) (EQ / Stomp)
 Shooting Stars (2011) (Armada)
 Global Soundsystem 2012: California (2012) (Armada)
 Hotel Rooms (2013) (Armada)
 Redefined (2014) (Global Soundsystem Records)
 Collide (2018) (Global Soundsystem Records)

Extended plays
 Never Seems So/Starcrossed (2007) (Trancetribe Recordings)
 Hide/Closer Than My Breath (2008) (AVA Recordings)
 When I Go (You Will Know) (2013) (S107 Recordings)
 The Promise (2014) (Global Soundsystem Records)
 The World Below (with Ian Urbina) (2020) (Synesthesia Media)

Singles
2006
 Familiar Streets (Mixology Digital Records)

2008
 Mind Games (Mazeman)
 Never Seems So / Starcrossed (Trancetribe Recordings)
 Russia (Armada Music)
 Fool (Armada Music)
 Under the Stars (Armada Music)
 Kopi Susu (Armada Music)
 Meet Me in Kyoto (Armada Music)

2009
 Somehow (featuring Dennis Sheperd featuring Marcie) (Armada Music)
 You Walk Away (featuring Audrey Gallagher) (Armada Music)
 Is it Cold? (Armada Music)
 Foolish (Armada Music)

2010
 Calling (featuring Audrey Gallagher) (Armada Music)
 Good Dream (Armada Music)
 Vanilla (featuring Tania Zygar) (Armada Music)
 Half Light (featuring Tania Zygar) (Armada Music)

2011
 Talking to Myself (featuring DJ Rap) (Armada Music)
 Acting Crazy (featuring Sarah Howells) (Armada Music)
 Never Go Back (featuring Brianna Holen) (Armada Music)
 Why Do I Care (featuring Tania Zygar) (Armada Music)

2012
 Loose Unit (with Richard Durand) (23 January)
 Sex, Lies and Still Oblivious (16 July) (Single + Remix pack)
 Jelly (Unreleased - DJ Mag Top 100 Voters Exclusive)
 Glow in the Dark (featuring Kerli) (22 October)
 Fire and Load (featuring Christina Novelli) (17 December) (Single + Remix Pack)

2013
 Nothing Really Matters (featuring Melanie Fontana) (9 April)
 Something About You (featuring Kerli) (30 July)
 Stem the Tides (with BT and Tania Zygar) (16 August)
 Tonight (with BT and JES) (16 August)
 Live this Lie (featuring Carmen Keigans) (11 November)

2014
 Stay (featuring Dia Frampton) (25 February)
 Redefined (featuring Melanie Fontana) (21 November)

2015
 If I Stayed (17 March)
 Tear Me Up (featuring Nash Overstreet) (18 September)

2016
 Only (featuring Olivia Somerlyn) (10 February)
 Oceans (with Jack Novak and Greyson Chance) (19 February)
 All I Ever Knew (featuring Cameron Walker) (20 May)
 For the First Time (featuring Michael Woolery) (9 July)
 Lost (featuring Asiahn) (12 August)
 Sharpest Weapon (with Morten featuring Cameron Walker) (16 December)

2017
 That's How You Know (with Col3man featuring Melanie Fontana) (3 March)
 Count on You (with Col3man featuring Jeremy Thurber) (26 May)
 Go for a Ride (featuring Luna) (as Wish I Was) (9 June)
 Beautiful War (featuring Lola Rhodes) (30 June)
 Closing In (with Christopher Tin featuring Dia Frampton) (13 October)
 Did you know? (with Christopher Tin featuring London Thor) (17 November)

2018
 You Don't Love Me (with Christopher Tin featuring Freesia) (26 January)
 Gold Blooded (with Christopher Tin featuring Dyson) (16 February)
 Please Stay (with Kundo featuring London Thor) (22 June)
 It Will Be Okay (featuring London Thor) (27 July)
 Let Go (featuring London Thor) (12 October)
 Say the Word (with JES) (7 December)

2019
 Fading (with Jes) (8 March)
 It's Always Now (with Matt Fax) (7 June)

2020
 I Wanna Believe (featuring Katie Sky) (13 March)
 Start Again (with Wish I Was featuring Breenley Brown) (22 May)
 Fool For You (30 October)

2021
 Feelin' Right (with Peytn and Bella Renee) (7 May)
 Tear Me Down (featuring Trey Rose) (27 August)

2022
 Just Believe (with Jes) (14 Jan)

Remixes
2007
 Andy Hunter featuring Christine Glass - Amazing (EMI)

2008
 D:Folt - I Come Running (Armada)

2009
 Re-ward and Dr. Willis - Maybe
 Beat Service and Tucandeo - Waiting for the Sun
 Nadia Ali - Fine Print
 4 Strings - Take Me Away (with Dennis Shepard)
 Adam K & Soha - Long Distance (Generationext)
 Rank 1 - L.E.D. There Be Light (High Contrast Recordings) [with Trent McDermott]
 Yamin featuring Marcie - Forward Motion (Motion Music)
 Ashley Wallbridge featuring Meighan Nealon "My Blood" (Auryn Music)
 Topher Jones - Different Parts

2010
 Alex Bartlett - [No Title] (Released in 2011 as "Reflected" under the Fabio XB moniker)
 Reckless - Heaven's Scent (tyDi's Vicious ReWrite)
 Lentos - Forget About Us

2011
 BT featuring Jes - The Light in Things
 Vegas Baby featuring Angelic - For The Love of You
 Allure featuring Jes - Show Me the Way
 Fabio XB - Reflected

2012
 Tenishia and Jan Johnston - As It Should (4 June)
 Andain - Turn Up the Sound (20 June)
 Emma Hewitt - Rewind (20 July)
 Kerli - The Lucky Ones (6 November)

2013
 Cher - Woman's World (22 July)

2019
 Whiteroom - The Whiteroom (18 January)
 Rat City - Kind of Love (5 April)

2021
 Segiri - Undone (27 October)

References

External links
 tyDi official site
 youtube.com/tyDiTV - tyDi on YouTube
 discogs.com - Discography
 TranceIsLife.com - tyDi on TranceIsLife.com
 soundcloud.com - Wish I Was on SoundCloud

1987 births
Living people
Armada Music artists
Australian DJs
Australian electronic musicians
Australian house musicians
Club DJs
Musicians from Queensland
People from the Sunshine Coast, Queensland
Remixers
Australian trance musicians
Electronic dance music DJs